Brent Dennis Lang (born January 25, 1968) is an American former competition swimmer and Olympic gold medalist.  At the 1988 Summer Olympics in Seoul, South Korea, Lang earned a gold medal by swimming for the winning U.S. team in the preliminary heats of the men's 4×100-meter freestyle relay.

Lang was a member of the Michigan Wolverines swimming and diving team while attending the University of Michigan.  In National Collegiate Athletic Association (NCAA) competition, he won four NCAA national championships as a Michigan swimmer—twice in the 50-yard freestyle (1989, 1990) and twice in the 100-yard freestyle (1988, 1990).

In December 2014, Lang was announced as one of the six recipients of the 2015 Silver Anniversary Awards, presented annually by the NCAA to outstanding former student-athletes on the 25th anniversary of the end of their college sports careers. The award is based on both athletic and professional success.

See also
 List of Olympic medalists in swimming (men)
 List of University of Michigan alumni
 List of World Aquatics Championships medalists in swimming (men)

References

External links
 

1968 births
Living people
American male freestyle swimmers
Michigan Wolverines men's swimmers
Olympic gold medalists for the United States in swimming
Swimmers at the 1988 Summer Olympics
Place of birth missing (living people)
World Aquatics Championships medalists in swimming
Medalists at the 1988 Summer Olympics
Universiade medalists in swimming
Universiade gold medalists for the United States
Medalists at the 1987 Summer Universiade